The Mudanjiang–Jiamusi high-speed railway, or Mudanjiang–Jiamusi section of Shenyang–Jiamusi high-speed railway, is a high-speed railway line in China. It was opened on December 6, 2021.

History
Construction on the railway began in November 2016.

Stations
The line will have seven stations:
Mudanjiang
Linkou South
Jixi West
Qitaihe West
Huanan East
Shuangyashan West
Jiamusi

References

High-speed railway lines in China
Railway lines opened in 2021